Johann Georg Tralles (15 October 1763 – 19 November 1822) was a German mathematician and physicist.

He was born in Hamburg, Germany and was educated at the  University of Göttingen beginning in 1783. He became a professor at the University of Bern in 1785. In 1810, he became a professor of mathematics at the University of Berlin.

In 1798 he served as the Swiss representative to the French metric convocation, and was a member of its committee on weights and measures. An iron "committee" meter, a duplicate of the prototype archive meter, was then given as a gift to Ferdinand Rudolph Hassler. From 1803 until 1805 these two men worked together on a topological survey of the Canton of Bern.

In 1819, he discovered the Great Comet of 1819, Comet Tralles, named after him.

He was the inventor of the alcoholometer, a device for measuring the amount of alcohol in a liquid.

He died in London, England. The crater Tralles on the Moon is named after him, as is the alcoholometer he invented.

References

Bibliography
 "Der erste Ordinarius für Mathematik an der Universität Berlin", Eine Edition seiner Antrittsvorlesung, 1810.
 "Beytrag zur Lehre von der Elektrizität" Bern, Haller, 1786

External links
 Ferdinand Rudolph Hassler and the United States Coast Survey, including his early work with Tralles.
 Tralles, Johann Georg, Berlin-Brandenburgische Akademie der Wissenschaften.

1763 births
1822 deaths
University of Göttingen alumni
18th-century German physicists
Discoverers of comets
18th-century German mathematicians
19th-century German mathematicians
19th-century German physicists
Academic staff of the University of Bern
Academic staff of the Humboldt University of Berlin